Beanana is an rural municipality in Madagascar. The city is in the central-north part of the island and is connected by the national road RN 4 to Antananarivo and Mahajanga.  This municipality belongs to the district of Maevatanana, which is a part of Betsiboka Region.

Infrastructure
Route Nationale 4 from Antananarivo, Maevatanana to Mahajanga.

Rivers
Beanana lies at the Ikopa River and the Betsiboka River.

Mining
The are important gold mining operations near the town.

References

Populated places in Betsiboka
Gold mines in Madagascar